Claes-Johan Rudolf Andersson (30 May 1937 – 24 July 2019) was a Swedish-speaking Finnish psychiatrist, author, poet, jazz musician, politician and member of the Finnish Parliament, representing the Left Alliance and the Finnish People's Democratic League. He was a member of the Finnish Parliament from 1987 to 1999 and from 2007 to 2008, and served as the Minister of Culture in the Lipponen I Cabinet.

References

External links

Parliament of Finland: Claes Andersson 

1937 births
2019 deaths
Writers from Helsinki
Finnish People's Democratic League politicians
Left Alliance (Finland) politicians
Government ministers of Finland
Members of the Parliament of Finland (1987–91)
Members of the Parliament of Finland (1991–95)
Members of the Parliament of Finland (1995–99)
Members of the Parliament of Finland (2007–11)
Finnish writers in Swedish
Finnish psychiatrists
Finnish jazz pianists
Articles containing video clips
Politicians from Helsinki
University of Helsinki alumni
Recipients of the Eino Leino Prize
21st-century pianists
Candidates for President of Finland
Swedish-speaking Finns